Alex Michaelides (born 1977) is a bestselling British Cypriot author and screenwriter. His debut novel, the psychological thriller The Silent Patient, is a New York Times and Sunday Times bestseller, with over three million copies sold.

Biography 
Michaelides was born in Cyprus to a Cypriot father and English mother. He studied English literature at Trinity College, Cambridge University.

He studied psychotherapy for three years, and worked for two years at a secure unit for young adults. This work provided material and inspiration for his debut novel The Silent Patient.

Work 
Michaelides' debut novel, The Silent Patient, was the No. 1 New York Times Bestseller of Hardcover Fiction in its first week and was the bestselling hardback debut in the US for 2019. It was a Sunday Times top 10 bestseller for seven weeks. On Amazon.com, it was the No. 2 most sold for 2019 in their list of Most Sold Books in fiction and named as their number one thriller of 2019. It also won the Goodreads Choice Award for Best Mystery & Thriller of 2019, was chosen as a Richard & Judy Book Club pick and as a Book of the Month in The Times. It was shortlisted for a Barry for best debut and Barnes and Noble's Book of the Year. Brad Pitt's production company, Plan B, is developing The Silent Patient as a film.

Michaelides' second novel, The Maidens, was published on 10 June 2021 by Orion Publishing (UK) and on 15 June 2021 by Celadon Books (US). It is a psychological detective story about a series of murders at a Cambridge college. The novel debuted at number two on The New York Times fiction best-seller list for the week ending 19 June 2021.

Michaelides also wrote the film The Devil You Know, starring Lena Olin, Rosamund Pike, and Jennifer Lawrence, and co-wrote The Con Is On, starring Uma Thurman, Tim Roth, Parker Posey, and Sofia Vergara.

Bibliography 

 The Silent Patient (2019)
 The Maidens (2021)

References

1977 births
Living people
21st-century English novelists
21st-century British novelists
Alumni of Trinity College, Cambridge
21st-century British screenwriters